Laagna is a subdistrict in the district of Lasnamäe, Tallinn, the capital of Estonia. It has a population of 24,251.

References

Subdistricts of Tallinn